Mumbo Jumbo commonly refers to:
Mumbo jumbo (phrase), an English phrase for a meaningless ritual or nonsense

Mumbo Jumbo may also refer to:

Music
Mumbo Jumbo (album), an album by the band Air Supply
Mumbo Jumbo (Robert Plant album), 1988; see Robert Plant discography
"Mumbo Jumbo", a 1981 song by Squeeze on the album East Side Story
"Mumbo Jumbo", a 2003 song by Foghat on the album Family Joules

Video games

MumboJumbo, a video game developer and publisher
Mumbo Jumbo (Banjo-Kazooie), a video-game character

Other uses
Mumbo Jumbo (novel)
Mumbo Jumbo (roller coaster)

See also
Mumbo (disambiguation)